Regional TV Weekend News is a Philippine television news broadcasting show broadcast by GMA News TV, GMA Network and GTV. It premiered on July 27, 2019, on GMA News TV and on March 21, 2020, on GMA Network. The show concluded on GMA Network on May 2, 2020. The show aired its last episode on July 24, 2021, to give way for Regional TV News.

History
GMA Regional TV was launched on July 27, 2019, on GMA News TV as GMA Regional TV Weekend News the first delivered English language across the provinces into national newscast, with the sole launching afternoon newscasts and started from Balitang Bisdak of GMA Cebu (Central and Eastern Visayas) with Lou Anne Mae Rondina (Main Anchor), Alan Domingo and Cecille Quibod-Castro (Co-Anchor). Meanwhile on August 3, 2019 Balitang Amianan of GMA Dagupan (North Central Luzon), the Filipino language newscast, presented by Jasmin Gabriel-Galban (Main Anchor), CJ Torida and Joanne Ponsoy (Co-Anchor). Then on August 10, 2019, the pioneering Hiligaynon newscast of One Western Visayas from GMA Iloilo (Western Visayas) presented by Adrian Prietos, Kaitlene Rivilla and Zen Quilantang (later replaced by Atty. Sedfrey Cabaluna on March 21, 2020, during the COVID-19 pandemic) and finally on August 17, 2019, the biggest newscast all over Mindanao One Mindanao from GMA Davao presented by Tek Ocampo (Main Anchor), Sarah Hilomen-Velasco and Real Sorroche (Co-Anchor)

From March 21, 2020, to May 2, 2020, GMA Regional TV Weekend News temporarily moved to GMA Network (during the COVID-19 pandemic) with a timeslot on Saturday 10:35 PM to 11:20 PM. This was until May 9, 2020, when the program returned to GMA News TV on its new timeslot Saturday 7:00 to 7:45 PM.

On July 4, 2020, the broadcast episode into anchors of GMA Iloilo's One Western Visayas are  Atty. Sedfrey Cabaluna and Kaitlene Rivilla and temporarily presenting for the newscast replacing GMA Cebu's Balitang Bisdak anchors are Lou Anne Mae Rondina, Alan Domingo and Cecille Quibod-Castro during ECQ of Metro Cebu until July 9, 2020.

On August 15, 2020, the newscast adopted a stand-up mode of delivery for the first time in a year, which would be soon followed by the respective regional newscasts.

The newscast had its last broadcast in the English language on September 5, 2020. The following week, on September 12, the newscast changed its medium of delivery to Tagalog.

The program had changed timeslots twice since then: 5:30-6:30 PM from September 19 to October 31 and 10:30-11:30 PM starting November 7. 

The program in longest broadcast was that of September 26, 2020, by the episode into Mining Issue of Alcoy in Cebu was temporarily stopped to operate.

The incident program episode broadcast on September 26, 2020, The Clearing Operation in Cebu City has being Violent War and blamed by the IATF and Clearing Team Operation.

On October 31, 2020, the episode of GMA Regional TV Presents: Kwento ng Kababalaghan was the scariest and bad dreamers for cemetery and bridge in Pangasinan and Anto Tan? as GMA Regional TV during the scariest story of North Central Luzon as Bat of Halloween.

The program had its second-longest broadcast on November 14, 2020, when GMA Regional TV covered the aftermath of Typhoon Vamco (Typhoon Ulysses) in Cagayan Valley, Central Luzon and Bicol. 

Later the broadcast episode of November 14, 2020, the Kapuso Barangayan on Wheels continues repacked by the anchors and correspondents of GMA Regional TV are Balitang Amianan for the residents of Dagupan in Pangasinan, One Western Visayas for the residents of Pavia in Iloilo and One Mindanao for the residents of Barangay Captain in Davao City during the pandemic.

The broadcast episode of November 28, 2020, into the sacrifices of Cagayan Valley of empty medicine meanwhile the boarder restrictions of Baguio was explained by Mayor Benjamin Magalong and other mayors of North Central Luzon.

On February 27, 2021, GMA Regional TV Weekend News became Regional TV Weekend News, to coincide the rebranding of GMA News TV to GTV last February 22. The following week, on March 6, 2021, Regional TV Weekend News had their first broadcast from GMA Bicol.

Meanwhile the broadcast episodes of March 20, 2021, Nikko Sereno (Sit-in Anchor for Alan Domingo during 500 years of Guiuan, Eastern Samar) for the first time Alan Domingo's absent of the newscast and he joins Lou Anne Mae Rondina and Cecille Quibod-Castro of GMA Cebu's Balitang Bisdak anchors and on July 3, 2021, Jandi Esteban (Sit-in Anchor for Real Sorroche during stricting MECQ to Metro Davao was extended until July 15, 2021, but extended also until July 31, 2021) for the first time Real Sorroche's absent of the newscast and she joins Tek Ocampo and Sarah Hilomen-Velasco of GMA Davao's One Mindanao anchors.

As Adrian Prietos was recovering from a PUJ accident, the May 15, 2021, broadcast episode went on without him.

Into the episode of July 16, 2021, for the first time GMA Regional TV was removed the bumper for respective regional newscasts started from Balitang Amianan (North Central Luzon), Balitang Bicolandia (Southern Luzon), One Western Visayas (Western Visayas), Balitang Bisdak (Central and Eastern Visayas), and One Mindanao (Mindanao, later divided into Southern, South Central and Northern Mindanao) and followed by the national Tagalog newscast of GTV's "Regional TV Weekend News" broadcast episode of July 17, 2021, anchored by Jasmin Gabriel-Galban, CJ Torida, and Joanne Ponsoy from Balitang Amianan and was already upcoming originating stations of GMA Batangas as (GMA Regional TV Southern Tagalog) with its upcoming Filipino newscast and GMA Zamboanga as (GMA Regional TV Western Mindanao) with its upcoming Chavacano newscast then morning show and also joined into the national Tagalog language newscast after GMA Davao's anchors Kapuso air date, also joined the Southern Tagalog Newscast and Western Mindanao Newscast of Regional TV News on GTV every mornings.

Meanwhile, GTV announced Regional TV News starts on July 26, 2021, every Monday to Friday at 10:00AM before Slam Dunk and Saturday at another 10:00AM before OMJ: Oh My Job as celebrating 2nd anniversary of GMA Regional TV's #LocalNewsMatters with the Tagalog Newscast "Regional TV Weekend News" was delivered hottest and biggest updates in the provinces.

Overview
The newscasts primarily covers weekly updates from Luzon, Visayas and Mindanao through its regional news bureaus in North Central Luzon (Dagupan and Ilocos, served by Balitang Amianan), Southern Luzon (Naga, served by Balitang Bicolandia), Western Visayas (Iloilo and Bacolod, served by One Western Visayas), Central and Eastern Visayas (Cebu, served by Balitang Bisdak) and Mindanao (Davao and Cagayan de Oro, served by One Mindanao).

Originally delivered in English since launch, the newscast decided already delivery to Tagalog since September 12, 2020, to present.

With the rebranding of GMA News TV to GTV on February 22, 2021, GMA Regional TV Weekend News dropped the "GMA" corporate name from its title five days later on February 27. But it is still refer as GMA Regional TV Weekend News as its primary name.

The March 6 episode marked the first time the anchors of Balitang Bicolandia host the newscast. And along with that, a refurbishing of their opening billboard.

Dagupan Bureau (North Central Luzon)

Pangasinan
Dagupan
Tarlac
Tarlac City
Nueva Ecija
Cabanatuan
Zambales
Olongapo
Bataan
Balanga
Aurora
Baler 
Bulacan
Malolos
Benguet 
Baguio
Mountain Province
Sagada
Ifugao
Banaue
La Union
San Fernando City
Ilocos Norte
Laoag 
Abra
Bangued 
Ilocos Sur
Vigan
Pampanga
San Fernando City
Batanes
Basco
Cagayan
Tuguegarao
Isabela
Santiago City
Nueva Vizcaya
Bayombong

Naga Bureau (Southern Luzon)

Camarines Norte
Daet 
Camarines Sur
Naga
Catanduanes
Virac
Albay
Legazpi  
Sorsogon
Sorsogon City
Masbate
Masbate City

Iloilo Bureau (Western Visayas)

Aklan
Kalibo
Antique
San Jose de Buenavista
Capiz
Roxas 
Iloilo
Iloilo City
Guimaras
Jordan
Negros Occidental
Bacolod

Cebu Bureau (Central and Eastern Visayas)

Metro Cebu 
Cebu
Cebu City
Bohol
Tagbilaran 
Negros Oriental
Dumaguete 
Siquijor
Siquior 
Leyte
Tacloban 
Southern Leyte
Maasin
Northern Samar
Catarman 
Samar
Calbayog 
Eastern Samar
Borongan
Biliran
Naval

Davao Bureau (Northern, South Central and Southern Mindanao)

Metro Davao
Davao del Sur
Davao City
Davao del Norte 
Tagum
Davao Oriental
Mati
Davao Occidental
Malita
Davao de Oro
Nabunturan
General Santos 
Sarangani
Alabel
Sultan Kudarat
Tacurong
South Cotabato
Koronadal
Maguindanao
Cotabato City
Cotabato
Kidapawan
Misamis Oriental
Cagayan de Oro
Misamis Occidental
Ozamiz
Lanao del Norte
Iligan
Lanao del Sur
Marawi
Bukidnon
Malaybalay
Zamboanga del Norte
Dipolog
Zamboanga del Sur
Pagadian
Camiguin
Mambajao
Agusan del Norte
Butuan
Surigao del Norte
Surigao City
Agusan del Sur
Bayugan
Surigao del Sur
Tandag
Dinagat Islands
San Jose
Zamboanga Sibugay
Ipil 
Zamboanga City
Basilan
Isabela
Sulu
Jolo
 Tawi-Tawi
Bongao

Final Anchors

From GMA Regional TV-Balitang Amianan of GMA Dagupan
 CJ Torida
 Jasmin Gabriel-Galban 
 Joanne Ponsoy 
Broadcast Location GMA Center, Claveria Road, Malued District, Dagupan, Pangasinan.

From GMA Regional TV-Balitang Bicolandia of GMA Bicol
 Jessie Cruzat 
 Rhayne Palino 
 Katherine Henry
Broadcast Location GMA Broadcast Complex, Concepcion Pequena, Naga, Camarines Sur.

From GMA Regional TV-One Western Visayas of GMA Iloilo
 Atty. Sedfrey Cabaluna 
 Kaitlene Rivilla
Broadcast Location GMA Compound, Phase 5, Alta Tierra Village, MacArthur Drive, Barangay Quintin Salas, Jaro, Iloilo City.

From GMA Regional TV-Balitang Bisdak of GMA Cebu
 Lou-Anne Mae Rondina 
 Alan Domingo
 Cecille Quibod-Castro 
Broadcast Location GMA Skyview Complex, Nivel Hills, Apas, Cebu City.

From GMA Regional TV-One Mindanao of GMA Davao
 Tek Ocampo
 Sarah Hilomen-Velasco 
 Jandi Esteban 
Broadcast Location GMA Complex, Broadcast Ave., Shrine Hills, Matina, Davao City.

Final Correspondents

North Central Luzon
 Ivy Hernando (Ilocos Sur)
 Joanne Ponsoy (Dagupan)
 Jasmin Gabriel-Galban (Dagupan)
 King Guevarra (Dagupan)
 Claire Lacanilao (Dagupan) 
 Russel Simorio (Dagupan) 

Bicol Region
 Rhayne Palino (Naga)
 Charm Ragiles (Naga)
 Katherine Henry (Naga)

Western Visayas
 Zen Quilantang (Iloilo)
 Darylle Marie Sarmiento (Iloilo)
 John Sala (Iloilo)
 Adrian Prietos (Bacolod)

Central & Eastern Visayas
 Alan Domingo (Cebu)
 Lou-Anne Mae Rondina (Cebu)
 Nikko Sereno (Cebu)
 Fe Marie Dumaboc (Cebu)

Northern, South Central & Southern Mindanao
 Cyril Chaves (Cagayan de Oro)
 Sheillah Vergara-Rubio (Davao)
 Rgil Relator (Davao)
 Jandi Esteban (Davao)
 Real Sorroche (Davao)

Former anchor
 Real Sorroche (Davao)

Former correspondents
 Clyde Macascas (Cagayan de Oro)
 Ethel Ipanag (Cagayan de Oro)
 Chona Carreon (Cebu)
 Lian Sinculan (Cebu)
 Kim Bandarlipe (Dagupan)

Accolades

References

External links
 

2019 Philippine television series debuts
2021 Philippine television series endings
English-language television shows
Filipino-language television shows
GMA News TV original programming
GTV (Philippine TV network) original programming
GMA Network news shows
GMA Integrated News and Public Affairs shows
Philippine television news shows